Lan Shizhang (Chinese: 兰世章; born 9 February 1974) is a Chinese weightlifter. He competed in the 1990s, winning several medals at World Championships and Asian Games. He lifted at the 1996 Olympic Games in Atlanta, finishing fourth in his class.

Lan is one of the few men in history to clean and jerk three times his own bodyweight with a lift of 162.5kg at 54kg, done at the 1997 National Games.

He's an uncle of weightlifter and 2008 Olympic champion Lu Yong.

References

External links
 Gottfried Schödl: World Championships Seniors 1997-2007 and Statistics , pp. 128, 136, 143

1974 births
Living people
Chinese male weightlifters
World Weightlifting Championships medalists
Asian Games gold medalists for China
Weightlifters at the 1994 Asian Games
Weightlifters at the 1998 Asian Games
Asian Games medalists in weightlifting
Medalists at the 1994 Asian Games
Medalists at the 1998 Asian Games
Olympic weightlifters of China
Weightlifters at the 1996 Summer Olympics
20th-century Chinese people